King Kong is a fictional giant ape-like creature from Skull Island who has appeared in several works since 1933.

King Kong may also refer to:

Film and television
 King Kong (franchise), a franchise centered on King Kong
 King Kong (1933 film), starring Fay Wray, Robert Armstrong and Bruce Cabot
 King Kong (1976 film), a remake of the 1933 film
 King Kong (2005 film), another remake of the 1933 film
 Kong: Skull Island, the 2017 reboot set in the Godzilla-Kong cinematic universe known as MonsterVerse
 Major T.J. "King" Kong, a character in the film Dr. Strangelove played by Slim Pickens

Music
 King Kong (band), a rock band from Louisville, Kentucky
 King Kong: Jean-Luc Ponty Plays the Music of Frank Zappa, a 1970 album
 King Kong (Gorilla Zoe album), released in 2011
 King Kong (1959 musical), a South African jazz-influenced musical
 King Kong (2013 musical), a musical that premiered in Australia, sometimes titled King Kong: The Eighth Wonder of the World
 King Kong (2005 soundtrack), the soundtrack to the 2005 film

Songs
 "King Kong" by The Kinks from the album "Arthur (Or the Decline and Fall of the British Empire)"
 "King Kong" (E-Rotic song), 2001
 "King Kong" (Jibbs song)
 "King Kong", by Bow Wow Wow from the album See Jungle! See Jungle! Go Join Your Gang Yeah, City All Over! Go Ape Crazy!
 "King Kong – Part 1", by Jimmy Castor
 "King Kong", a composition by Frank Zappa on the 1969 Mothers of Invention album Uncle Meat
 "King Kong", by Daniel Johnston on the album Yip/Jump Music
 "King Kong (Your Song)", by Bobby Pickett and Peter Ferrara

Sports
 Nickname of Joseph Agbeko, a Ghanaian boxer 
 Nickname of Alexander Romanov, a Moldovan mixed martial artist and freestyle wrestler
 King Kong Bundy (1955-2019), ring name of Chris Pallies, professional wrestler
 King Kong Brody, ring name of Frank Goodish (1946–1988), professional wrestler, also known as Bruiser Brody
 King Kong (Emile Czaja), ring name of Emile Czaja (1909-1970), Australian-Indian professional wrestler
 King Kong Mosca, ring name of Angelo Mosca, professional wrestler and former CFL football player
 King Kong, ring name of Scott Thompson, professional wrestler
 King Kong Kirk, Malcolm Kirk (1935-1987), English former professional wrestler

People
 King Kong (musician), Jamaican reggae singer
 King Kong (actor), Tamil film actor
 King Kong Lee (born 1981), Taiwanese host and actor
 King Kong Lam (born 1969), Hong Kong actor

Other uses
 Kenny McFarlane, a character nicknamed "King Kong" from the Ultimate Spider-Man series
 King Kong, a nickname of Second World War double agent Christiaan Lindemans
 King Kong (comics), several comic books based on the famous movie monster
 King Kong (Universal Studios Dubailand), a roller coaster at Universal Studios Dubailand, Dubai, United Arab Emirates
 King Kong milk candy, a Peruvian candy
 King Kong statue, a 1972 pop art statue by Nicholas Monro
 King Kong (Atari 2600), a 1982 video game
 King Kong by Starship, a South Korean entertainment company (formerly known as King Kong Entertainment)
 Kong: The 8th Wonder of the World, a 2015 video game
 Peter Jackson's King Kong, a video game based on the 2005 film

See also
 King Kong & D. Jungle Girls, an Italian Europop singing group
 "King Kong Song", by ABBA
 Kong (disambiguation)
 Kongō (disambiguation)
 Congo (disambiguation)
 金剛山 (disambiguation)